Agave parryi, known as Parry's agave or mescal agave, is a flowering plant in the family Asparagaceae, subfamily Agavoideae. It is a slow-growing succulent perennial native to Arizona, New Mexico, and northern Mexico.

The leaves are grey green and have a spine at the tip.  One of the distinguishing features is that the point on the tip, which is typically dark tan, brown, or black, is darker than the leaf.  Indentations of previous leaves show on the back of each leaf.  The Huachuca variety grows in a rosette pattern as large as 2½ feet in diameter.

Because of its compact size, plus its low water use and low maintenance, Huachuca agave is considered a good landscaping plant for desert residential landscaping. It requires full sun.

Parry's agave is evergreen.  Aged agave produce a twelve-foot stalk with bright yellow blooms.  They then die after blooming, as all leaf and root resources are put into the stalk, flowers, and seeds.  It can be propagated by either offset or seed.

This plant has gained the Royal Horticultural Society’s Award of Garden Merit.

Varieties 
 Agave parryi var. huachucensis, Huachuca agave
 Agave parryi var. truncata, Mescal agave
 Agave parryi var. couseii

Subspecies 
Agave parryi subsp. parryi
 Agave parryi subsp. neomexicana (Wooton & Standl.) B.Ullrich

References

External links

USDA Forest Service: Parry's Agave (Agave parryi)
Mescal Agave
Arizona.edu: Agave parryi var. huachucensis — by the Master Gardeners of the University of Arizona Pima County Cooperative Extension.

parryi
Flora of the Chihuahuan Desert
Flora of Northeastern Mexico
Flora of Northwestern Mexico
Flora of Arizona
Flora of Chihuahua (state)
Flora of New Mexico
Flora of Sonora
Taxa named by George Engelmann
Garden plants of North America
Drought-tolerant plants